Kamau Peterson (born September 16, 1978) is a former professional Canadian football wide receiver and formerly the offensive coordinator for the York Lions football team. He last played for the BC Lions of the Canadian Football League. He was originally drafted sixth overall by the Calgary Stampeders in the 2001 CFL Draft and won the 89th Grey Cup with the team that year. Although he was born in Los Angeles, California, United States, Peterson grew up in  Detroit, Michigan, but was schooled in LaSalle, Ontario, so he counts as a non-import in the CFL.

Kamau transitioned into his post-football career by founding PlaymakerU which trained young athletes in many sports but especially football. Based in Sherwood Park, Alberta he operated out of a new facility there. Peterson entered into coaching in 2012, serving as receivers coach on Team Canada's Jr. National (U19) Team from 2012 through 2016, earning 2 golds and a silver medal in World Championship play. (Texas 2012, Kuwait 2014, Harbin 2016) From there he joined the York University Football staff as Receivers coach and Assistant OC in 2014, taking over as Offensive Coordinator from 2017 through 2019 before moving on from York in 2020. During his time at York, Peterson spearheaded the resurgence of the York Offence, as well as served as their Strength and Conditioning coach. Peterson is widely recognized as an integral figure in the recruiting and player development of the Lions resurgence.

References

External links

1978 births
Living people
Calgary Stampeders players
Canadian football wide receivers
Canadian Football League Most Outstanding Canadian Award winners
Edmonton Elks players
Hamilton Tiger-Cats players
New Hampshire Wildcats football players
People from Essex County, Ontario
Players of Canadian football from Ontario
Winnipeg Blue Bombers players